"Let Me Down Easy" is a song by Australian alternative rock band Gang of Youths, released in May 2017 as the third single from their second studio album Go Farther in Lightness (2017). The song peaked at number 49 on the ARIA singles chart, becoming the band's first top 50 single. In the Triple J's 2017 Hottest 100, it was listed at No. 2 – the highest position by an Australian artist. It was certified double platinum by ARIA in 2019 for shipment of 140000 copies. The song placed second in the 2018 Vanda & Young Global Songwriting Competition.

Background 

Australian alternative rock band Gang of Youths released "Let Me Down Easy" in May 2017, as the third single ahead of their second album, Go Farther in Lightness, which appeared in August. The album was produced from November to December 2016 at Sony Music Studios, Sydney by Adrian Breakspear and the group. The line-up was Donnie Berzestowski on drums, Max Dunn on bass guitar, Jung Kim on guitar and keyboards, David Le'aupepe on lead vocals, piano and guitar and Joji Malani on lead guitar. The track was written by Le'aupepe.

"Let Me Down Easy" reached the ARIA singles chart top 50. For national youth radio Triple J's listeners poll Hottest 100 of 2017, it was placed second – the highest position by an Australian artist. In the Hottest 100 of the 2010s, held in 2020, the song placed number 19. It was certified double platinum, for shipments of 140000 units, by ARIA in 2019. For the song Le'aupepe was placed second in the 2018 Vanda & Young Global Songwriting Competition.

Simon Tubey of X-Press magazine reviewed the album and described the track as having an "upbeat tempo and catchy hook making it an instantly distinctive 'festival banger', which any crowd would love. The distinctive oriental sound only serves to cement the song's uniqueness." In the Hottest 100 of the 2010s, held in 2020, the song placed number 19.

Charts

Certifications

References

2017 singles
2017 songs
Gang of Youths songs